Lord Dirleton can refer to:

 Lord Haliburton of Dirleton, a title in the Peerage of Scotland
 Lord Erskine of Dirleton, a title in the Peerage of Scotland
 John Nisbet, Lord Dirleton (c. 1609–1687), Scottish judge